Accounting reform is an expansion of accounting rules that goes beyond financial measures for both individual economic entities and national economies.  It is advocated by those who consider the focus of the current standards and practices wholly inadequate to the task of measuring and reporting the activity, success, and failure of the modern enterprise, including government.

The real debate concerns concepts such as whether to report transactions, such as asset acquisitions, at their cost or their current market values. The former, traditional approach, appeals for its reliability but can quickly lose its relevance due to inflation and other factors; the latter, an increasingly common approach, is appealing for its relevance but is less reliable due to the need to use subjective measures. Accounting standards setters such as the International Accounting Standards Board attempt to balance relevance and reliability.

Business 

Limited reforms within professional management circles have led to activity-based costing, economic value-added, and risk measures. Current accounting practices have also been criticized for being too complex.

Heads of the U.S. Securities and Exchange Commission since the 1980s have consistently complained that this lobbying makes it impossible for them to apply meaningful reform, even in the wake of accounting scandals, e.g., that which felled Arthur Andersen in 2002.

National economies 
Any comprehensive scheme of accounting reform is a major professional and academic enterprise. Typically it requires examination of the role of each of the fundamental factors of production, an analysis of capital indicating how many types there are and how each supports each factor of a production process.

A comprehensive scheme that would affect, for instance, the United Nations standards for national accounts, the rules of the Bank for International Settlements, or listing requirements on the major stock exchanges would have to defend any change against critics that advocated lesser reforms.

Marilyn Waring, who deeply criticized the UN account system for systematically under-valuing women's social and economic contributions, also stated that she had to read an entire room full of books to understand the standards applied today.

The critique from ecological economics claims that most means of measuring well-being indicated that the developed nations were in a state of "uneconomic growth" through the 1980s and 1990s, primarily due to failures of measurement, most or all of which could be traced back to the practice of using Gross National Product or other narrow indicators as a means of making money supply (and other economic) decisions.

Robert Costanza, Paul Hawken, Amory Lovins, and others who advocate a consistent global system for valuing natural capital note that failures in this area are particularly grim:  promoting extinction, biodiversity loss, climate change, and destructive weather for the sake of such "growth".  John McMurtry characterized this as "the cancer stage of capitalism".
What makes "economic sense" under current standards, they argue, is leading to ecological catastrophe, social conflict, and economic chaos.

Notable advocates
Notable advocates of accounting reform:
Baruch Lev
Lawrence A. Cunningham
Marilyn Waring
Robert Costanza
Amory Lovins

See also
Philosophy of Accounting
standard accounting practices
economic value added
risk
Inflation accounting

References
 Online Accounting Software

National accounts
Accounting
Environmental economics